Media in Seattle includes long-established newspapers, television and radio stations, and an evolving panoply of smaller, local art, culture, neighborhood and political publications, filmmaking and, most recently, Internet media. As of the fall of 2009, Seattle has the 
20th largest newspaper and the 13th largest radio and television market in the United States. The Seattle media market also serves Puget Sound and Western Washington.

Seattle has been at the forefront of new media developments since the 1999 protests of a meeting of the World Trade Organization in Seattle spurred the formation of the city's Independent Media Center, which covered and disseminated the breaking news online to a worldwide audience. The location of Microsoft just outside Seattle in nearby Redmond, and the growth of interactive media companies have made Seattle prominent in new digital media.

Newspapers

Seattle's major daily newspaper is The Seattle Times. The local Blethen family owns 50.5% of the Times, the other 49.5% being owned by the McClatchy Company.  The Times holds the largest Sunday circulation in the Pacific Northwest. The Seattle Post-Intelligencer (now online only) is owned by the Hearst Corporation.  The Seattle Daily Journal of Commerce covers economic news, and The Daily of the University of Washington, the University of Washington's school paper, is published five days per week during the school year.

The Seattle newspaper landscape changed dramatically in 2009, when the Seattle Post-Intelligencer ceased print publication. Previously, the Post-Intelligencer and The Seattle Times had shared a joint-operating agreement under which the Times handled business operations outside the newsroom for its competitor. When the Post-Intelligencer went online-only as SeattlePI.com, The Seattle Times felt the blow financially but continues to be a profit-earning publication and even increased its print circulation in 2009 by 30 percent. Nonetheless, the P-Is move to online-only resulted in 145 jobs lost at that publication, while The Seattle Times cut 150 editorial positions shortly before that, in December 2008. The Times reaches 7 out of 10 adults in King and Snohomish Counties. With fewer resources, the Times took steps to consolidate some of its news coverage: for example, folding the daily business section into the paper's A section. The Seattle Times has been recognized for its editorial excellence: The newspaper has been the recipient of nine Pulitzer Prizes. In recent years, the Times has begun to partner with other types of media outlets, including collaborations with several local bloggers that are funded by American university's J-Lab: the Institute for Interactive Journalism and the John S. and James L. Knight Foundation.

The most prominent weeklies are the Seattle Weekly and The Stranger. Both consider themselves alternative papers.  The Stranger, founded in 1992, is locally owned and has a younger and hipper readership.  The Seattle Weekly, founded in 1976, has a longstanding reputation for in-depth coverage of the arts and local politics.  It was purchased in 2000 by Village Voice Media, which in turn was acquired in 2005 by New Times Media. New Times Media has decreased the Weekly's emphasis on politics.  Other weekly papers are the Seattle Gay News and Real Change, an activist paper sold by homeless and low-income people.  The Puget Sound Business Journal covers the local economy.  The Rocket, a long-running weekly paper devoted to the music scene, stopped publishing in 2000.

Seattle is also home to several ethnic newspapers.  Among these are the African American papers The Facts and the Seattle Medium; the Asian American papers the Northwest Asian Weekly, Seattle Chinese Post, and the International Examiner; and the JTNews (formerly the Jewish Transcript). There are also numerous neighborhood newspapers, such as the Seattle Sun and Star, the West Seattle Herald, the Ballard News-Tribune, and the papers of the Pacific Publishing Company, which include the Queen Anne News, Magnolia News, North Seattle Herald-Outlook, Capitol Hill Times, Beacon Hill News & South District Journal, and the Madison Park Times.

Daily
Respect My Region
Seattle Daily Journal of Commerce
The Seattle Times

Weekly

The Catholic NW Progress
Eat The State
International Examiner
Marples Northwest Business Letter
Nguoi Viet Tay Bac (Vietnamese language)
North American Post
Northwest Asian Weekly
Phuong Dong News (Vietnamese language)
Puget Sound Business Journal
Seattle Chinese Post (Chinese language)
Seattle Chinese Times (Chinese language)
Epoch Times Seattle (Chinese language)
Seattle Gay News
Seattle Jewish Transcript
Seattle Medium
Seattle Soy Sauce (Japanese language)
Shoreline/Lake Forest Enterprise
El Siete Dias (Spanish language)
The Skanner
The Stranger

Community
Robinson Newspapers publishes Westside Weekly,  which is a combination of the Ballard News-Tribune, West Seattle Herald / White Center News, and The Highline Times / The Des Moines News.

Ballard News-Tribune
Capitol Hill Times
The Highline Times
Madison Park Times
Shoreline/Lake Forest Enterprise
Queen Anne & Magnolia News
West Seattle Herald

College

The Daily
The Falcon
The Sentinel
SU Spectator
Seattle Central College

Defunct

 The Argus
 Helix
 North Seattle Journal
 Seattle Post-Intelligencer
 The Seattle Star 
 Seattle Star (2002–2005)
 Seattle Union Record
Seattle Weekly

Magazines
425 Magazine, its companion for the business market, 425 Business and South Sound, and South Sound Business are published by Premier Media and reach the greater Puget Sound area.

Two locally owned magazines for parents, ParentMap Newsmagazine and Seattle's Child, are published monthly. Conscious living magazine Seattle Natural Awakenings is also locally owned and published monthly. The multi-ethnic glossy Colors NW publishes a companion Colors NW video podcast. Seattle Magazine and Seattle Metropolitan, local lifestyle magazines, are published monthly. Northwest Woman Magazine is a regional bimonthly publication for the Northwest woman; it is published in Spokane.

425Business is a monthly Seattle business magazine.

Environmental online magazines Worldchanging and Grist are based in Seattle.

Sound Rider!, an online motorcycling magazine, is also published from Seattle.

OutdoorsNW magazine, published by Price Media, Inc. in Seattle since 1988, serves the active, outdoor recreational enthusiasts.

Satire
Seattle has a long history of hyper-local satire that stretches from the days of a late-night skit show Almost Live!—which launched the careers of Joel McHale and Bill Nye the Science Guy—to its current satire website, The Needling. The Needling, which calls itself "Seattle's Only Real Fake News" is described by many as a local version of satire site The Onion.

Television
The Seattle television market is the 13th largest in the United States; it includes the adjacent cities of Tacoma, Bellevue, Everett, and Bellingham; and additional viewers from British Columbia, Canada (Vancouver and its surrounding area on broadcast and cable).

Seattle is served by numerous television stations. The major network affiliates are KOMO 4 (ABC), KING 5 (NBC), KIRO 7 (CBS), KCTS 9 (PBS) and KCPQ 13 (Fox), which are also seen across Canada via digital cable and satellite providers. Also broadcasting in English are KSTW 11 (The CW), KONG 6/16 Independent station run by/with KING TV, KTBW 20 (TBN), KZJO 22 (MyNetworkTV), KBTC 28 (PBS), KVOS 12, KWPX-TV 33 (ION), KFFV 45 (MeTV).  Most of these can be seen in Canada via digital cable or satellite. There is also a Spanish-language station: KUNS 51 (Univision).

Seattle's commercial TV stations distinguish themselves from one another in various ways. KING-TV, owned by Tegna Media, has been nominated for 56 Regional Emmy Awards. The station allows viewers to submit their own photo and video content via its website and also highlights the work of average citizens in the community on-air in the recurring feature, "Home Team Heroes." The former parent company of KOMO, Fisher Communications (which sold its media properties to the Sinclair Broadcast Group in 2013), launched a network of hyperlocal websites in 2009, which include blogs about issues related to community service, news of interest to families, crime news, and news about events occurring around the neighborhood. Finally, KIRO, owned by Cox Enterprises, maintains three reporters in a Washington, DC, bureau to cover news of interest to viewers back in Washington State.

Seattle also has three public television stations. The Seattle Channel, Government-access television (GATV) run by the city, airs public affairs, community service, and arts programming. The station is funded partly by cable television franchise fees and partly by a $5 million grant from Comcast, which will be paid over 10 years to support arts programming. After first focusing on civic programming, the Seattle Channel has become known for its arts programming. As the station's on-air priorities have begun to emphasize arts programs, it has shifted much of the government accountability-oriented programming to live streaming on the Internet, best accessed by viewers with high-speed Internet access. KCTS-TV is Seattle's PBS member station and operates three feeds: a primary, high-definition, general interest station; KCTS 9 PBS Kids (digital subchannel 9.2), which features children's programs; and KCTS 9 Create (digital subchannel 9.3), which features DIY, cooking, arts and crafts, and travel programs. In 2009 KCTS aired 160 episodes in a regularly occurring series on local public affairs, personal finance, economic issues, and business affairs. While KCTS is a popular source for viewing nationally produced PBS shows, it features less programming on local public affairs than the region's other two public TV stations. The third public station, SCAN, is Seattle's public access cable television network. A 501(c)3 nonprofit, it provides equipment, production facilities, and media instruction for residents of Seattle and other King County communities. Although its funding is limited, SCAN often airs more locally produced public affairs programming each week than all the city's broadcast networks combined.

Cable networks based out of the area include Root Sports Northwest, ResearchChannel and UWTV. Seattle cable viewers also receive CBUT-DT 2 (CBC) from Vancouver, British Columbia, often carried on cable channel 99. The 24-hour Northwest Cable News was available on cable until 2017.

Broadcast TV
Note: Bold letters''' indicate a network owned-and-operated station.

Cable TV

Radio

Seattle has the thirteenth largest radio market in the United States, though this ranking does not take into account Canadian audiences. The radio market stretches across Puget Sound and Western Washington. The Seattle PI ran an article in February 2010 about the start of the radio industry in Seattle.

AM stations

FM stations

Coverage of news and public affairs across Seattle's radio dial is inconsistent. KIRO (97.3 FM), which has a newsroom of 30 people, airs 34 hours of news programming per week, with a primary focus on local reporting; counting news analysis segments and related programming, this reaches 91 hours per week. KNWN (1000 AM and 97.7 FM) airs news and commentary 24 hours per day, 7 days per week. Kris Bennett Broadcasting, a trio of stations serving the black community, airs 5 hours of local talk radio programming each week.

Many Seattle radio stations are also available through internet radio, with KEXP being the first radio station to offer real-time playlists, broadcast uncompressed CD quality music over the internet 24 hours a day, and offer internet archives of its shows (podcasts). Hollow Earth Radio began as an online-only station, emphasizing local artists outside the mainstream music scene, but in 2017 added a low power FM broadcast capability.

Internet
Seattle's first significant foray into Internet media came along with Indymedia, a co-op started in 1999 that has since spread to many cities around the world. In the decade since the founding of Indymedia, all of the city's mainstream media outlets have established or augmented their online presence, and numerous blogs have sprung up to supplement traditional media. The city hit another first when the Seattle Post-Intelligencer became the first online-only newspaper in the nation, and as SeattlePI.com, that outlet has experimented with its growth by adding reader blogs and neighborhood-focused blogs. The P-I first began experimenting with blog-driven community engagement with the "Big Blog," a local news blog whose founding reporter used to hold regular public meet-ups with Seattle residents, a practice now embraced by other local bloggers, as well.

Across the Seattle region, 43% of adults read news online on a regular basis and another 21% read or contribute to blogs. In addition to blogs, other online media outlets that offer wider-ranging coverage include Crosscut, started by Seattle Weekly founder David Brewster and more recently acquired by Cascade Public Media, Publicola.net, Investigate West & Seattle Post Globe. Sea Beez, a content-sharing online portal for ethnic media outlets, is in the process of launching a local news site.

Additionally, Seattle offers several locally focused online publications.  SportsPressNW, founded by sports columnists Art Thiel and Steve Rudman, focuses on sports.  GeekWire, founded in 2011 by former P-I reporters John Cook and Todd Bishop, focuses on the technology and startup industries.  Do206 focuses on arts-and-entertainment event listings, news and information was founded by Adam Zacks, founder of the Sasquatch! Music Festival, and Scott Porad, a local technology executive.

In 2018, the online non-profit Cascadia Magazine was launched, "covering people, places and culture of the Pacific Northwest" with both in-depth features and literary works. Stories and authors span Washington, Oregon and British Columbia. It was started by journalist Andrew Engelson. A daily newsletter, begun in 2017, offers curated news briefs about/around the Pacific Northwest from other local news outlets.

Seattle is served by a number of online media outlets: The City of Seattle Information Technology department identified 260 websites focused on Seattle's local neighborhoods and communities, including non-traditional, linked news and information outlets. Much of this online activity is driven by the rich hyperlocal news scene in the city, which has seen an exponential growth this past decade. This has been led in the area by sites such as westseattleblog.com and myballard.com, but also old media companies such as KOMO. There's a pair of articles here and here covering the ad scene for hyperlocal in January 2010.

Seattle's online hyperlocal media vary greatly in terms of web traffic, scope, and resources. Some sites are run by journalists first trained in traditional media, such as Next Door Media, a network of 10 neighborhood blogs that nets a combined 1 million page views per month. By comparison, SeattleTimes.com and SeattlePI.com average 45 million and 40 million monthly page views, respectively. Capitol Hill Seattle, another popular hyperlocal blog, commands 200,000 monthly page views, and West Seattle Blog, 900,000. Despite varied audiences, a content analysis conducted by the New America Foundation found that online media are filling gaps in news coverage left by traditional media. The study looked at Capitol Hill Seattle, West Seattle Blog, My Ballard, Wallyhood, SeattlePI.com, and SeattleTimes.com, and found that the first four sources (all hyperlocal blogs) devoted a greater percentage of their news coverage to issues specific to Seattle's neighborhoods. SeattleTimes.com and SeattlePI.com, on the other hand, covered more metro, national, and international news. The blogs devoted a greater percentage of their coverage to the combined subjects of politics, health, education, employment, social services, and arts and entertainment.

The background to Seattle's extensive coverage on the Internet is the city's history of flourishing alternative media, ranging from small presses to low power FM radio broadcasting. The independent, volunteer-run KRAB-FM radio, a high powered station that operated on 107.7 MHz in the regular broadcast band, influenced a generation of listeners during the 1960s and 1970s. Later, before Internet radio became practical, a number of very low power, microradio FM stations broadcast on the few FM frequencies not allocated to high power stations. Currently, FCC deliberations and rulings about Internet radio are followed not only by Internet entrepreneurs, but also by those Seattleites who produced and listened to local radio as well as by those who produce and read the numerous local print publications.

Movies
Many movies have been set or filmed in the Seattle area (although many were actually filmed in Vancouver), including:

 10 Things I Hate about You (1999 film)
 3000 Miles to Graceland (2001 film)
 50/50 (2011 film)
 The 6th Man (1997 film)
 88 minutes (2008 film)
 Agent Cody Banks (2003 film)
 Air Bud (1997 film)
 American Heart (1992 film)
 Another Stakeout (1993 film)
 Assassins (1995 film)
 Austin Powers: The Spy Who Shagged Me (1999 film)
 Battle in Seattle (2008 film)
 Black Widow (1987 film)
 Carpool (1996 film)
 The Changeling (1980 film)
 The Christmas List (1997 TV film)
 Chronicle (2012 film)
 Cinderella Liberty (1973 film)
 Class of 1999 (1990 film)
 Code Name: The Cleaner (2007 film)
 Cthulhu (2007 film)
 The Details (2011 film)
 Disclosure (1994 film)
 Double Jeopardy (1999 film)
 Expiration Date (2006 film)
 Extreme Days (2001 film)
 The Fabulous Baker Boys (1989 film)
 Fat Kid Rules the World (2012 film)
 Fear (1996 film)
 Fifty Shades of Grey (2015 film)
 Finding Mr. Right (2013 film)
 Firewall (2006 film)
 Get Carter (2000 film)
 A Guy Thing (2003 film)
 The Hand That Rocks the Cradle (1992 film)
 Harry and the Hendersons (1987 film)
 Harry in Your Pocket (1973 film)
 The Heart of the Game (2006 documentary)
 House of Games (1987 film)
 The Immaculate Conception of Little Dizzle (2009 film)
 It Happened at the World's Fair (1963 film)
 The King of Fighters (2010 film)
 The King of Kong: A Fistful of Quarters (2007 documentary)
 Laggies (2014 film)
 The Last Mimzy (2007 film)
 Life or Something Like It (2002 film)
 Little Buddha (1993 film)
 Love, Guaranteed (2020 film)
 Love Happens (2009 film)
 Mad Love (1995 film)
 Man of the House (1995 film)
 Max Rules (2005 film)
 McQ (1974 film)
 My Mother's Future Husband (2014 television film)
 My Own Private Idaho (1991 film)
 The Night Strangler (1973 TV film)
 No Retreat, No Surrender (1986 film)
 An Officer and a Gentleman (1982 film)
 Outsourced (2006 film)
 The Paper Tigers (2020 film)
 The Parallax View (1974 film)
 Paycheck (2002 film)
 Perfect Body (1997 television film)
 Police Beat (2005 film)
 Rapture-Palooza (2013 film)
 The Ring (2002 film)
 Robin of Locksley (1996 TV film)
 Safety Not Guaranteed (2012 film)
 Saving Silverman (2001 film)
 Say Anything... (1989 film)
 Scorchy (1976 film)
 Shoot to Kill (1988 film)
 Short Time (1990 film)
 Singles (1992 film)
 Slaves to the Underground (1997 film)
 Sleepless in Seattle (1993 film)
 The Slender Thread (1965 film)
 Sonicsgate (2009 documentary)
 Sonic the Hedgehog 2 (2022 film)
 Stakeout (1987 film)
 Street Fighter II: The Animated Movie (1994 film)
 Streetwise (1984 documentary)
 Surviving the Game (1994 film)
 Things We Lost in the Fire (2007 film)
 This Boy's Life (1993 film)
 This Is Spinal Tap (1984 film)
 Tugboat Annie (1933 film)
 Unforettable (1996 film)
 The Vanishing (1993 film)
 Walking Tall (2004 film)
 WarGames (1984 film)

Media art non-profits
 911 Media Arts Center
 Knok Studio
 Northwest Film Forum

 Analysis 

Friedland (2014) and others have lauded Seattle as a model for the nation and perhaps the world in its robust "civic communication ecology" that attempts to provide high speed Internet access and computer and media training to all, including those with low incomes, that has allegedly contributed to a higher rate of democratic participation than elsewhere.  Friedland identified three key features of this:

 "[A] robust, healthy local newspaper [The Seattle Times''], with a strong online presence that  ... will be a hub of connection, rather than the single authoritative fount of knowledge."  
 "[A] civic communications network [that is] equally accessible to everyone", subsidized at least initially by municipal investment in neighborhood centers that provide free or low-cost training in computer and media literacy.  
 "[A] larger civic communication ecology [resting] on the foundation of a ... robust micro-ecology, among individuals, niches, groups, and neighborhoods, that generates information from below."

In this system, news percolates up as well as down with news writing and research being shared between levels in an open and conscious way.  This system has been created out of a combination of the high-tech base of the metro area with higher than average education level and incomes but with modest grants (typically a few thousand dollars) for a variety of projects funded by government, J-Lab and the John S. and James L. Knight Foundation.

References

External links

 
Seattle
 
 
 
 
Seattle
Seattle-related lists